Sideroxylon lycioides, the buckthorn bully, is a small tree in the family Sapotaceae. It is widely distributed in the southeastern United States from Texas to southeast Virginia.

The fruit pulp is thin but edible and consumed by birds. Livestock browse the plant's foliage.

References

lycioides
Trees of the Southeastern United States
Trees of the Northeastern United States
Trees of the North-Central United States
Trees of the South-Central United States
Trees of the Great Lakes region (North America)